Rette Jones Racing is an American professional stock car racing team that currently competes in the ARCA Menards Series. The team is owned by Terry Jones and friend Mark Rette and currently fields the No. 30 Ford for Frankie Muniz in the ARCA Menards Series. The team has a technical alliance with Sam Hunt Racing in the Truck series.

NASCAR Gander RV & Outdoors Truck Series

Truck No. 30 history
The team debuted at the Careers for Veterans 200 at Michigan International Speedway with Chad Finley driving the No. 30 Ford. Although Finley would qualify 15th, he would be forced to start at the back due to a window net problem. He would quickly move up to 21st, but was unable to improve on that, and finished there 4 laps down. Finley would return for the American Ethanol E15 225 at Chicagoland Speedway, where he would qualify 16th and finish 21st 9 laps down. The No. 30 would appear one more time in 2015 with team co-owner Terry Jones at the Fred's 250 at Talladega Superspeedway, but that time was a Chevrolet truck. Although the team would qualify 25th, they would crash after completing 35 laps and be eliminated, placing 31st.

In 2016, the team returned at Charlotte with Jesse Little behind the wheel of the No. 30 Toyota Tundra but after performing well in practice, the qualify was rained out and set by Owners' points, so the team failed to qualify. So the team attempted the following race at Texas, but now with the No. 81, after made a partnership with Hattori Racing Enterprises and finished 19th.

The team would return in 2017 in a one-off attempt at the NextEra Energy Resources 250 at Daytona International Speedway with Terry Jones driving the No. 30 Ford, again. The team would manage to make the race qualifying 24th, but would get caught in The Big One on lap 4 and place 25th.

Truck No. 02 history
Dominique Van Wieringen made her Truck Series' debut at Phoenix driving No. 02 Ford for RJR in a technical alliance with Young's Motorsports. She finished 31st after being involved in a crash with Austin Wayne Self and Tommy Joe Martins in the early laps of the race.

Truck No. 11/82 history
In 2019, the team would sign Spencer Davis to drive in 5 races in 2019. The team would first attempt the NextEra Energy 250 at Daytona International Speedway under the No. 82 Ford banner, but would fail to qualify. Davis would also drive at the renumbered No. 11 Ford at Martinsville. Starting at Kentucky, the team switched to Toyota and also drove at Las Vegas, and attempted the race at Homestead-Miami but failed to qualify. The 11 would still continue, but Davis would move to his own team Spencer Davis Motorsports.

ARCA Menards Series

Car No. 30 history
Before the team's founding in 2015, Terry Jones had been fielding cars in the ARCA Racing Series since 2003, usually for himself, in around 4-8 races each year, and the team was called Jones Group Racing. Bob Blount, Chad Blount and Jesse Smith also had driven for Jones. The team had 6 Top 5 and 12 Top 10 in 64 races between 2003 and 2013.

Rette Jones Racing made the series debut at Daytona with Terry Jones behind the wheel of the No. 30 Toyota as usual and finished 19th. He also ran at Talladega, where he finished 16th.

In 2016, Corey Deuser made his series debut at the Herr's Potato Chips 200 at Winchester Speedway driving the No. 30 Ford Fusion, he would start in 7th, but the team would suffer a clutch issue relegating them to a 17th-place finish. Rette Jones would return with Clair Zimmerman behind the wheel of the No. 30 Ford at Berlin Raceway for the Berlin ARCA 200, where he would finish 6th upon starting 12th. Terry Jones once again drove at Daytona and Talladega and crashed in both of them, with a season-best finish of 28th at Talladega.

In 2017, Terry Jones returned at Daytona, in the No. 30 Toyota, he led 25 laps and finished 2nd, the best finish ever of the team in the ARCA Series. Jones returned at Talladega, driving the No. 33 Toyota in a partnership with Win-Tron Racing but he blew the engine in the early laps and finished last.

In 2018, Grant Quinlan would drive in a one-off attempt the No. 30 Ford, at the Lucas Oil 200 at Daytona International Speedway. The team would start 24th, but finish 37th after an engine problem.

In 2019, Quinlan would return driving a Ford at Daytona, as well as Talladega for the General Tire 200. Quinlan would perform very well at both events, scoring top 10's in both and a top 5 at Daytona.

In 2020, Dominique Van Wieringen ran the season-opener, crashing out for 25th.

In 2021, the team had attempted more than half of the season, drivers like ARCA Menards Series West graduate Brittney Zamora, late model driver Cole Williams, Mexican ARCA Menards Series East full-timer Max Gutiérrez, road course ringer Kris Wright, United States Auto Club Midget standout Adam Lemke, and dirt track star Landen Lewis.

In 2022, Amber Balcaen ran for the team full-time, finishing 7th in series points. On January 11, 2023, it was announced that actor Frankie Muniz would be replacing Balcaen, with the team upgrading their cars from Ford Fusions to Mustangs.

Other teams
Max Gutiérrez drove the No. 32 for AM Racing, under the Rette Jones Racing banner in the 2022 Lucas Oil 200.

ARCA Menards Series East

Car No. 30 history
Rette Jones Racing made their NASCAR K&N Pro Series East debut with Grant Quinlan driving the No. 30 Ford Fusion in 2015, at Columbus, he led 63 laps and finished 2nd. Quinlan also drove at New Hampshire and Richmond but finished 15th and 20th, respectively.

In 2016, the team ran full-time with Dominique Van Wieringen behind the wheel. She had 3 Top 5 and 4 Top 10 in 14 races, with a best finish of 3rd (twice).

In 2017, the team returned full-time with Tyler Dippel behind the wheel. At Visit Hampton VA 150 in Langley, Dominique Van Wieringen replaced Dippel, who was running an ARCA race at DuQuoin, Wieringen would finished 3rd. Dippel had 2 Top 5 and 4 Top 10 in the other 13 races.

In 2018, the team ran full-time once again but with multiple drivers, Dippel drove at the season opener and finished 9th, Quinlan drove 6 races, with a pole-position (the first of the team) and had 2 Top 5 and 4 Top 10, and Dominique's younger brother, Tristan Van Wieringen drove 7 races for the team, with a best finish of 9th.

In 2019, Spencer Davis drove full-time with the team, he ran with No. 82 at the season opener at New Smyrna and finished 7th, and starting at 2nd race, the car was renumbered back to No. 30. Davis ended the season with 1 win (the first of the team) at Gateway, 6 Top 5, and 11 Top 10 in 12 races.

In 2020, Tristan Van Wieringen will run full-time for the team.

In 2021, Max Gutiérrez will run full-time for the team.

In 2022, he will return for New Smyrna and Dover, while Amber Balcaen will run the final 3 combination events.

Car No. 29 history
The No. 29 of RJR made his debut in 2016, Jesse Little was scheduled to drive 5 races for the team, but he withdrew after the qualify at Bristol. Little had 2 Top 5 and 3 Top 10, in the 4 races he ran behind the wheel of the No. 29 Toyota, with a best-finish of 2nd. Grant Quinlan drove the No. 29 Ford in one race and finished 18th. Corey Deuser ran 2 races behind the wheel of the No. 29 Ford, with a best-finish of 12th.

Car No. 28 history
The No. 28 Ford of RJR also made his debut in the 2016 season, with Clair Zimmerman, he drove the No. 28 in two races, with a best finish of 16th. Dominique Van Wieringen also drove the No. 28 in one race in 2016, and finished 10th.

In 2017, the team returned, with Dylan Murry, he drove the No. 28 Ford in two races (Greenville and Watkins Glen) and finished 6th and 8th respectively. Grant Quinlan also drove the No. 28 in one race and finished 8th.

Other teams
Spencer Davis drove the No. 82 for Danny Watts Racing, in a technical alliance with Rette Jones Racing in the 2018 NASCAR K&N Pro Series East.

References

External links
 
  (Terry Jones)
  (Mark Rette)

NASCAR teams
ARCA Menards Series teams